This is a list of the tallest buildings in Doha, Qatar. Most of the skyscrapers in Doha are located in the zone of West Bay. The tallest building in Doha is Aspire Tower. Apart from the current tallest buildings in the city, there are a number of supertall skyscrapers on hold. Doha is a rapidly growing city, with many of its tallest skyscrapers having been finished in the last ten years.

Completed buildings
This list includes the completed or topped-out buildings in Doha.

Under construction

Proposed

Notes 
A.  Construction is currently on hold due to lack of finances

See also
 List of tallest buildings in Asia
 List of tallest buildings

References

External links
 Emporis Doha, Qatar
 List of Tallest buildings in Doha - CTBUH
 Buildings of Doha on Skyscraperpage

Doha
Tall

simple:List of tallest buildings in the world